The Korg PadKontrol was a USB MIDI controller manufactured by Korg. The PadKontrol was released in 2005 as a competitor to the Akai MPD and the M-Audio Triggerfinger. The PadKontrol has sixteen assignable, velocity sensitive pads, with sixteen "scenes" which allow the user to toggle between various pad configurations, and an assignable X-Y pad for drum rolls, flams, or controller input inside a VSTi or a MIDI sequencer.

Use
The PadKontrol is commonly used for controlling virtual drum instruments in a MIDI sequencer (such as ezdrummer or BFD). Additionally, the PadKontrol can be used to control a software sampler Kontakt, for example) or can be used to control values within a MIDI sequencer.

Native Mode
When the PadKontrol is placed in native mode, the user has control over every button and light on the unit (including the LED display) and can use software on the computer to send MIDI data to the PadKontrol, giving programmers a means by which to write their own software for the PadKontrol.

See also
Korg
MIDI controller

External links
 PadKontrol Native Mode
 Manufacturer Information
 Video Overview of the PadKontrol

Computer peripherals
Electronic musical instruments
MIDI